The 2008–09 Premier League (known as the Barclays Premier League for sponsorship reasons) was the 17th season since the establishment of the Premier League in 1992. Manchester United became champions for the 11th time on the penultimate weekend of the season, defending their crown after winning their tenth Premier League title on the final day of the previous season. They were run close by Liverpool, who had a better goal difference and who had beaten United home and away, including a 4–1 victory at Old Trafford, but who were undone by a series of draws. The campaign – the fixtures for which were announced on 16 June 2008 – began on Saturday, 16 August 2008, and ended on 24 May 2009. A total of 20 teams contested the league, consisting of 17 who competed in the previous season and three promoted from the Football League Championship. The new match ball was the Nike T90 Omni.

At the start of this season, clubs were allowed to name seven substitutes on the bench instead of five. This season was also different in that there was no New Year's Day game, as is traditional. This was because the FA Cup Third Round is traditionally played on the first Saturday in January, which in 2009 fell in the usual spot for New Year's league games. September saw Manchester City taken over by the Abu Dhabi United Group, transforming them into one of the world's wealthiest football clubs, securing the signing of Robinho for a British record £32.5 million just seconds before the 2008 summer transfer window closed in the process.

The first goal of the season was scored by Arsenal's Samir Nasri against newly promoted West Bromwich Albion in the fourth minute of the early kick-off game on the opening day of the season on 16 August. Gabriel Agbonlahor of Aston Villa scored the first hat-trick of the season against Manchester City, scoring three goals in the space of seven minutes. Manchester United clinched the 2009 Premier League title with a scoreless draw against Arsenal on 16 May 2009, their 11th Premier League title, and 18th League title overall, drawing level with fierce rivals Liverpool who finished as runners-up. It is the second time they clinched the title for three consecutive years, the first being in 2001. Only three other clubs have achieved this feat: Liverpool (1980s), Arsenal (1930s) and Huddersfield Town (1920s).

West Bromwich Albion were the first team to be relegated to the Championship after losing 2–0 at home to Liverpool on 17 May 2009. They were joined in the Championship by Middlesbrough and Newcastle United on the last day of the season after Middlesbrough's 2–1 defeat at West Ham United and Newcastle's 1–0 defeat at Aston Villa. It meant that Hull City and Sunderland stayed up despite home defeats to Manchester United and Chelsea respectively. The fact that Hull City avoided relegation (along with Stoke City, who stayed up relatively comfortably under the management of Tony Pulis), meant it was the first time since the 2005–06 season that more than one promoted club maintained their Premier League status. Aston Villa, Everton and Fulham all secured European football for the 2009–10 season through their league position.

Teams
Twenty teams competed in the league – the top seventeen teams from the previous season and the three teams promoted from the Championship. The promoted teams were West Bromwich Albion, Stoke City (returning to the top flight after absences of two and twenty-three years respectively) and Hull City (playing top flight football for the first time ever). This was also Stoke City's first season in the Premier League. They replaced Reading (ending their two-year top flight spell), Birmingham City and Derby County (both teams relegated after a season's presence).

Stadiums and locations

Personnel and kits
(as of 24 May 2009)

Also, Nike provided new match balls, white with red and yellow (autumn/spring) and yellow with purple and black (winter), based on their T90 Laser II Omni model.

Managerial changes

  Newcastle United manager Joe Kinnear was originally appointed as interim manager until the end of October on 26 September, signed a one-month contract extension on 24 October, and was named manager until the end of the English football season on 28 November.
  Portsmouth caretaker manager Paul Hart was appointed on 9 February. On 3 March chairman Alexandre Gaydamak confirmed the appointment would be until at least the end of the English football season.
  Chelsea manager Guus Hiddink remained Russia manager until the end of the English football season, when he left Chelsea and returned to his Russia duties on a full-time basis.
  Newcastle United manager Joe Kinnear took leave from Newcastle United following heart bypass surgery on 16 February. His assistants, Chris Hughton and Colin Calderwood, were appointed to serve as caretaker managers until his return, which was understood might not occur before the end of the English football season. On 31 March, Alan Shearer was appointed manager until the end of the season, as Joe Kinnear was not able to return to his Newcastle United duties until the end of the English football season. After the season ended, both Joe Kinnear and Alan Shearer left the club permanently, and Chris Hughton was appointed manager during the course of the following season.
  Roberto Martínez was announced to be manager on 9 June, however due to complications surrounding the appointment of backroom staff, the deal was not finalised and officially announced until 15 June.

League table

Results

Season statistics

Scoring
 First goal of the season: Samir Nasri for Arsenal against West Bromwich, 3 minutes and 40 seconds. (16 August 2008).
 Last goal of the season: Kenwyne Jones for Sunderland against Chelsea, 90 minutes. (24 May 2009)
 Fastest goal in a match: 31 seconds – Steve Sidwell for Aston Villa against Everton (7 December 2008))
 Goal scored at the latest point in a match: 90+4 minutes and 56 seconds – Carlton Cole for West Ham United against Blackburn (30 August 2008)
 First own goal of the season: Robert Huth (Middlesbrough) for Tottenham Hotspur, 90+2 minutes and 28 seconds (16 August 2008)
 First hat-trick of the season and fastest hat-trick of the season: Gabriel Agbonlahor (Aston Villa) against Manchester City, 7 minutes and 3 seconds (17 August 2008)
 Most goals scored by one player in a match: 4 goals – Andrey Arshavin (Arsenal) against Liverpool, 36', 67', 70', 90' (21 April 2009)
 Widest winning margin: 6 goals – Manchester City 6–0 Portsmouth (21 September 2008)
 Most goals in a match: 8 goals
 Arsenal 4–4 Tottenham Hotspur (29 October 2008)
 Liverpool 4–4 Arsenal (21 April 2009)
 Most goals in one half: 7 goals – Liverpool v Arsenal (21 April 2009) 0–1 at half time, 4–4 final
 Most goals in one half by a single team: 5 goals – Manchester United v Tottenham Hotspur (25 April 2009) 0–2 at half-time, 5–2 final

Top scorers

Clean sheets
 Most clean sheets – Manchester United (24)
 Fewest clean sheets – Hull City (6)

Discipline
 First yellow card of the season: Sam Ricketts for Hull City against Fulham, 28 minutes and 6 seconds (16 August 2008)
 First red card of the season: Mark Noble for West Ham United against Manchester City, 37 minutes and 20 seconds (24 August 2008)
 Card given at latest point in a game: Michael Dawson (red) at 90+8 minutes and 28 seconds for Tottenham Hotspur against Stoke City (19 October 2008)
 Most yellow cards in a single match: 8
 Chelsea 1–1 Manchester United – one for Chelsea (Mikel John Obi) and seven for Manchester United (Paul Scholes, Rio Ferdinand, Gary Neville, Dimitar Berbatov, Wayne Rooney, Patrice Evra and Cristiano Ronaldo) (21 September 2008)
 Sunderland 1–1 Arsenal – three for Sunderland (Dean Whitehead, Kieran Richardson and Dwight Yorke) and five for Arsenal (Gaël Clichy, Kolo Touré, Alex Song, Nicklas Bendtner and Emmanuel Adebayor) (4 October 2008)
 Aston Villa 2–2 Arsenal – four for Aston Villa (Gabriel Agbonlahor, Nigel Reo-Coker, Stiliyan Petrov and Gareth Barry) and four for Arsenal (Alex Song, Kolo Touré, Abou Diaby and Robin van Persie) (26 December 2008)
 Manchester United 3–0 Chelsea – three for Manchester United (Cristiano Ronaldo, Wayne Rooney and Park Ji-sung) and five for Chelsea (Frank Lampard, José Bosingwa, Ricardo Carvalho, John Terry and Juliano Belletti) (11 January 2009)
 Manchester City 1–0 Sunderland – three for Manchester City (Valeri Bojinov, Gélson Fernandes and Shaun Wright-Phillips) and five for Sunderland (Phil Bardsley, Calum Davenport, Grant Leadbitter, Andy Reid and Anton Ferdinand) (22 March 2009)
 Most red cards in a single match: 3 – Manchester City 1–2 Tottenham Hotspur – two for Manchester City (Richard Dunne and Gélson Fernandes) and one for Tottenham Hotspur (Benoît Assou-Ekotto) (9 November 2008)

Table related statistics

Overall
 Most wins – Manchester United (28)
 Fewest wins – Middlesbrough and Newcastle United (7)
 Most losses – West Bromwich Albion (22)
 Fewest losses – Liverpool (2)
 Most goals scored – Liverpool (77)
 Fewest goals scored – Middlesbrough (28)
 Most goals conceded – West Bromwich Albion (67)
 Fewest goals conceded – Chelsea and Manchester United (24)

Home
 Most wins – Manchester United (16)
 Fewest wins – Hull City (3)
 Most losses – Hull City (11)
 Fewest losses – Liverpool (0)
 Most goals scored – Manchester United (43)
 Fewest goals scored – Middlesbrough and Wigan Athletic (17)
 Most goals conceded – Hull City (36)
 Fewest goals conceded – Tottenham Hotspur (10)

Away
 Most wins – Chelsea (14)
 Fewest wins – West Bromwich Albion (1)
 Most losses – Middlesbrough (15)
 Fewest losses – Liverpool (2)
 Most goals scored – Arsenal (37)
 Fewest goals scored – West Bromwich Albion (10)
 Most goals conceded – Stoke City (40)
 Fewest goals conceded – Manchester United (11)

Miscellaneous
 Longest injury time: 11 minutes, 2 seconds – Stoke City against Tottenham Hotspur (19 October 2008)

Awards

Monthly awards

Annual awards

Premier League Manager of the Season
Sir Alex Ferguson, 67, picked up the Premier League Manager of the Season for the ninth time. During his hugely successful spell with Manchester United, which began in 1986, he won eleven Premier League titles, five FA Cups, three League Cups, three European titles, one Intercontinental Cup and one Club World Cup.

Premier League Player of the Season
Nemanja Vidić, 27, won the Premier League Player of the Season accolade for the first time.

PFA Players' Player of the Year
The PFA Players' Player of the Year award for 2009 was won by Ryan Giggs of Manchester United.

The shortlist for the PFA Players' Player of the Year award was as follows:
 Rio Ferdinand (Manchester United)
 Steven Gerrard (Liverpool)
 Ryan Giggs (Manchester United)
 Cristiano Ronaldo (Manchester United)
 Edwin van der Sar (Manchester United)
 Nemanja Vidić (Manchester United)

PFA Team of the Year

Goalkeeper: Edwin van der Sar (Manchester United)Defence: Glen Johnson (Portsmouth), Patrice Evra, Rio Ferdinand, Nemanja Vidić (all Manchester United)Midfield: Steven Gerrard (Liverpool), Cristiano Ronaldo, Ryan Giggs (both Manchester United), Ashley Young (Aston Villa)Attack: Nicolas Anelka (Chelsea), Fernando Torres (Liverpool)

PFA Young Player of the Year
The PFA Young Player of the Year award was won by Ashley Young of Aston Villa.

The shortlist for the award was as follows:
 Gabriel Agbonlahor (Aston Villa)
 Jonny Evans (Manchester United)
 Stephen Ireland (Man City)
 Aaron Lennon (Tottenham Hotspur)
 Rafael (Manchester United)
 Ashley Young (Aston Villa)

FWA Footballer of the Year
The FWA Footballer of the Year award for 2009 was won by Steven Gerrard for the first time. The Liverpool captain saw off the challenges of Manchester United winger Ryan Giggs and forward Wayne Rooney, who finished second and third respectively.

Premier League Golden Boot
Chelsea striker Nicolas Anelka won the Premier League Golden Boot award for the first time. He scored 19 goals in 35 appearances, which ensured he finished as the season's top scorer.

Premier League Golden Glove
Manchester United goalkeeper Edwin van der Sar collected the Premier League Golden Glove award for the first time. He kept a total of 21 clean sheets in 33 appearances, including a record run of 11 consecutive clean sheets (1,311 minutes) from Stoke City on 15 November 2008 to West Bromwich Albion on 27 January 2009.

Premier League Fair Play Award
The Premier League Fair Play Award is merit given to the team who has been the most sporting and best behaved team. Fulham won this, ahead of London neighbours Chelsea and Arsenal. Hull City were deemed the least sporting side, finished in last place in the rankings

LMA Manager of the Year
The LMA Manager of the Year award was won by David Moyes after leading Everton to back-to-back fifth-place finishes and the FA Cup Final.

PFA Fans' Player of the Year
Steven Gerrard was named the PFA Fans' Player of the Year.

Premier League Merit Award
Aston Villa and former Blackburn Rovers goalkeeper Brad Friedel was honoured with the Premier League Merit Award after reaching 167 consecutive Premier League appearances on 5 December 2008.
 Manchester United goalkeeper Edwin van der Sar collected the Premier League Premier League Merit Award after breaking the Premier League record for minutes played without conceding a goal, spanning 11 consecutive clean sheets from Stoke City on 15 November 2008 to West Bromwich Albion on 27 January 2009.
 Portsmouth goalkeeper David James was honoured with the Premier League Premier League Merit Award after he broke the Premier League's appearance record with 536 appearances on 14 February 2009 in Portsmouth's 2–0 victory over Manchester City.

Premier League Spirit Award
The Premier League Spirit Award is given to "the player or manager whose actions best encapsulate the spirit of the game". In recognition for leading his club to the top of the Fair Play league, the Premier League Spirit Award for 2008–09 was given to Fulham manager Roy Hodgson.

Behaviour of the Public League
Given to the best-behaved fans, Fulham won this for the third consecutive year, rounding off a hat-trick of sporting awards.

References

External links

League and cup results for all the 2008/09 Premier Division clubs at footballsite
 2008–09 Premier League Season at RSSSF
 Official season review at premierleague.com

 
Premier League seasons
Eng
1